Dulo may refer to:

Dulo clan (or House of Dulo), from which descended the earliest Bulgarian Dynasty
Dulo, Mandara, the capital of the historical Mandara kingdom in what is now Cameroon

See also 
 Dolo (disambiguation)
 Jennifer Dulos
 Dulu (disambiguation)